Akebia is a genus of five species of flowering plant, within the family Lardizabalaceae. The scientific name, akebia, is a Latinization of the Japanese name for the species Akebia quinata: .

Species
There are five species:

Hybrids
 Akebia × pentaphylla (Makino) Makino (A. quinata × A. trifoliata)

Fruit
Akebia quinata and Akebia trifoliata both bear edible fruit, containing a sweet white flesh. Flavor varies greatly in akebias, even within the same species, with some individuals displaying a complex flavor profile resembling a mixture of banana, passionfruit and lychee, with others being mild, or even insipid (flavorless). The "insipid" akebia varieties have the flavor intensity of dragon fruit

Akebia in Japan
Akebia is often mentioned in Japanese literature, where it is evocative of pastoral settings. Although the akebi commonly refers to the five-leafed species, the three-leafed species is used in much the same way for novelty food, medicine, and for vine material.

While only a minor food eaten while foraging in the past, akebia is considered a specialty crop today, only available when in season. The pods contain a white, semi-translucent gelatinous pulp that is mildly sweet and full of seeds. The taste is described as sweet but rather "insipid".  Some people recollect in idyllic terms how they foraged for it in the hills as children.

The purple-colored, slightly bitter rind has been used as a vegetable in Yamagata Prefecture or in those northern areas, where the typical recipe calls for stuffing the rind with minced chicken (or pork) flavored with miso. Minor quantities of akebia are shipped to the urban market as a novelty vegetable.

In addition to consuming the fruit, akebia leaves are also made into a tea infusion. Outside of food and drinks, akebia vines are used for basket-weaving crafts. An old source lists Minakuchi, Shiga and Tsugaru (now Aomori Prefecture) as localities that produced baskets from the vines of trifoliate variety.

Akebia in North America 
Akebia quinata is a minor invasive species in the majority of the East Coast and was introduced in 1845 as an ornamental plant. This is because the plant has no natural predators or diseases in North America and can grow as it pleases. Its shade tolerance and ability to endure full sun allow it to adapt to nearly all conditions in is grown in. In the East Coast, Akebia quinata has been reported in, Florida, Georgia, Alabama, Louisiana, Tennessee, South Carolina, North Carolina, Missouri, Kentucky, Virginia, West Virginia, Ohio, Indiana, Illinois, Delaware, Maryland, Pennsylvania, New Jersey, Massachusetts, Vermont, Connecticut, Rhode Island, and as far north as Michigan and Wisconsin.

In the West Coast of the United States, Akebia quinata has not become a very invasive species. However, it has been reported in Washington State and Oregon.

Gallery

References

Further reading

External links
 Akebia: Three Varieties including photographs by Paghat's Garden
 Akebia: Edible Fruits including photographs by Paghat's Garden

Lardizabalaceae
Ranunculales genera
Japanese vegetables
Flora of China
Flora of Eastern Asia
Medicinal plants of Asia
Taxa named by Joseph Decaisne